Below is a partial list of neuromuscular disorders.

Affecting muscle

Muscular dystrophies

Dystrophinopathies 
 Duchenne muscular dystrophy
 Becker muscular dystrophy
 DMD-associated dilated cardiomyopathy

Limb girdle muscular dystrophies 
Limb girdle muscular dystrophies (LGMD) as defined by the European Neuromuscular Centre in 2018. They are named by the following system: LGMD, recessive or dominant inheritance (R or D), order of discovery (number), affected protein.
 LGMD D1 DNAJB6-related
 LGMD D2 TNP03-related
 LGMD D3 HNRNPDL-related
 LGMD D4 calpain3-related
 LGMD D5 collagen 6-related
 LGMD R1 calpain3-related (Calpainopathy)
 LGMD R2 dysferlin-related
 LGMD R3 α-sarcoglycan-related
 LGMD R4 β-sarcoglycan-related
 LGMD R5 γ-sarcoglycan-related
 LGMD R6 δ-sarcoglycan-related
 LGMD R7 telethonin-related
 LGMD R8 TRIM 32-related
 LGMD R9 FKRP-related
 LGMD R10 titin-related
 LGMD R11 POMT1-related
 LGMD R12 anoctamin5-related
 LGMD R13 Fukutin-related
 LGMD R14 POMT2-related
 LGMD R15 POMGnT1-related
 LGMD R16 α-dystroglycan-related
 LGMD R17 plectin-related
 LGMD R18 TRAPPC11-related
 LGMD R19 GMPPB-related
 LGMD R20 ISPD-related
 LGMD R21 POGLUT1-related
 LGMD R22 collagen 6-related
 LGMD R23 laminin α2-related
 LGMD R24 POMGNT2-related

Congenital muscular dystrophies 
 LAMA2-related (merosin deficient) congenital muscular dystrophy (Emery–Dreifuss muscular dystrophy)
 Collagen VI-related muscular dystrophy (Bethlem myopathy, Ullrich congenital muscular dystrophy)
 α-Dystroglycanopathies (Walker–Warburg syndrome, muscle-eye-brain disease)
 Laminopathies

Distal muscular dystrophy 
Distal muscular dystrophy, also called distal myopathy, is essentially any muscle disease that preferentially affects the hands and/or feet, a much less common pattern than proximal muscle weakness.
 Late adult-onset type 1
 Late adult-onset type 2a
 Late adult-onset type 2b
 Early adult-onset type 1
 Early adult-onset type 2
 Early adult-onset type 3

Myofibrillar myopathy 
Myofibrillar myopathies are diseases that cause similar findings of affected muscle when viewed under a microscope.
 Desminopathy
 Myotilinopathy
 Zaspopathy
 Filaminopathy
 Bag3opathy

Other muscular dystrophies
 Myotonic dystrophy
 Facioscapulohumeral muscular dystrophy
 Emery–Dreifuss muscular dystrophy (EDMD)

Congenital myopathies 
 Nemaline myopathy
 Central core myopathy
 Centronuclear myopathy
 Congenital fiber type disproportion
 Multi/minicore myopathy
 Cylindrical spirals myopathy

Metabolic diseases 
Mutations causing defects in metabolism can cause muscle damage due to inadequate energy for muscles or accumulation of waste products.

Mitochondrial myopathy
Mitochondrial myopathies are diseases caused by mutations related to mitochondria, and thus are generally inherited from the mother with variable expressivity due to heteroplasmy.
 Kearns–Sayre syndrome
 Mitochondrial encephalomyopathy, lactic acidosis, and stroke-like episodes (MELAS)
 Myoclonic epilepsy with ragged red fibers (MERRF)
 Cytochrome c oxidase (COX) deficiency
 Mitochondrial complex I deficiency
 Mitochondrial complex II deficiency
 Mitochondrial complex III deficiency (cytochrome b deficiency)
 mtDNA deletion

Glycogen storage disease
Glycogen storage diseases (GSD) are a group of diseases caused by mutations related to glycogen metabolism.
 GSD type II (Pompe disease)
 GSD type V (McArdle disease)
 GSD type VII (Tarui disease)
 GSD type XI (Lactate dehydrogenase deficiency)
 GSD type X (Phosphoglycerate mutase deficiency)
 Phosphoglycerate kinase deficiency

Fat oxidation defect
 Carnitine palmitoyltransferase I deficiency
 Carnitine palmitoyltransferase II deficiency
 Medium-chain acyl-coenzyme A dehydrogenase deficiency
 Long-chain 3-hydroxyacyl-coenzyme A dehydrogenase deficiency
 Very long-chain acyl-coenzyme A dehydrogenase deficiency

Other metabolic myopathies
 Myoadenylate deaminase (MADA) deficiency

Inflammatory myopathies 
 Inclusion body myositis
 Dermatomyositis
 Polymyositis
 Statin-associated autoimmune myopathy

Other diseases of muscle 
 Rippling muscle disease
 Drug-induced myopathy

Affecting nerve 
 Troyer syndrome
 Cramp fasciculation syndrome
 Hereditary spastic paraplegia
 Spinocerebellar ataxia
 Spinal and bulbar muscular atrophy

Neuronopathies
A neuronopathy affects the cell body of a nerve cell in the peripheral nervous system.
 Amyotrophic lateral sclerosis
 Spinal muscular atrophy
 Spinal muscular atrophy with respiratory distress type 1
 Atypical motor neuron diseases
 Dorsal root ganglion disorders

Neuropathy
A neuropathy affects the peripheral nerves.
 Guillain–Barré syndrome
 Charcot–Marie–Tooth disease
 Chemotherapy-induced peripheral neuropathy

Compressive (entrapment) neuropathies

Upper extremity
 Median neuropathy at wrist (carpal tunnel syndrome)
 Proximal median neuropathy
 Ulnar neuropathy at elbow
 Ulnar neuropathy at wrist
 Radial neuropathy 
 at the spiral groove
 in the axilla
 superficial radial sensory neuropathy
 posterior interosseous neuropathy
 Suprascapular neuropathy
 Axillary neuropathy
 Musculocutaneous neuropathy
 Long thoracic neuropathy

Lower extremity
 deep peroneal mononeuropathy at the fibular neck
 common fibular mononeuropathy at the hip
 deep fibular mononeuropathy at the ankle
 superficial fibular mononeuropathy
 sciatic mononeuroapthy at the hip or thigh
 piriformis syndrome
 proximal tibial mononeuropathy
 tarsal tunnel syndrome
 interdigital neuropathy (Morton's Neuroma)
 sural mononeuropathy
 femoral mononeuropathy
 saphenous mononeuropathy
 lateral femoral cutaneous neuropathy
 ilioinguinal neuropathy
 iliohypogastric neuropathy
 genitofemoral neuropathy
 posterior femoral cutaneous neuropathy
 obturator neuropathy
 neuropathy of gluteal nerves

Cranial nerve palsies
 trigeminal nerve
 trigeminal neuralgia
 trigeminal sensory neuropathy
 numb chin syndrome
 numb cheek syndrome
 herpes simplex virus infection
 facial nerve
 bell's palsy
 bilateral facial palsy
 congenital (trauma, Mobius syndrome, cardiofacial syndrome)
 glossopharyngeal nerve
 glossopharyngeal neuralgia
 glomus jugulare tumor
 vagus nerve injury
 spinal accessory nerve palsy
 hypoglossal nerve injury

Affecting neuromuscular junction 
 Myasthenia gravis
 Congenital myasthenic syndrome
 Lambert–Eaton myasthenic syndrome
 Isaac's syndrome

Other 
 Multiple sclerosis
 Stiff-person syndrome

References

Myoneural junction and neuromuscular diseases